Anjugramam is a panchayat town in Kanniyakumari district  in the state of Tamil Nadu, India.

Before 1956, Anjugramam was united with Kerala, and was located at the border of the states of Travancore-Cochin state and Madras state. Now it is in Kanniyakumari district, at the border of the district.

Demographics
, Anjugramam had a population of 9,000. It has a higher literacy rate compared to the national average rate. Most of the people in the town are into various businesses as it is one of the main centers for shopping in the Kanyakumari district.

Education
Anjugramam is surrounded by several private and government educational institutions. Nearby schools include St. Stella's Matriculation Higher Secondary School, John's Central School - CBSE, Mount Litera Zee School, Christ CMI Central School, Government High School to name a few. Some notable colleges include,  CAPE Institute of Technology(CIT), Rohini College of Engineering & Technology, Government Arts and Science College are situated nearer to Anjugramam junction with all modern facilities in the district.

References

Cities and towns in Kanyakumari district